The 1978–79 United Counties League season was the 72nd in the history of the United Counties League, a football competition in England.

Premier Division

The Premier Division featured 19 clubs which competed in the division last season, no new clubs joined the division this season.

League table

Division One

The Division One featured 18 clubs which competed in the division last season, along with 2 new clubs, promoted from Division Two:
Northampton Spencer reserves
Ampthill Town reserves

League table

Division Two

The Division Two featured 12 clubs which competed in the division last season, along with 4 new clubs:
Burton Park Wanderers, relegated from Division One
Sharnbrook, relegated from Division One
Thrapston Venturas
Rothwell Town reserves

League table

References

External links
 United Counties League

1978–79 in English football leagues
United Counties League seasons